Donald James McWatters (born 23 January 1941) is a former field hockey player from Australia, who won the bronze medal with the Men's National Team at the 1964 Summer Olympics in Tokyo, Japan.

References

External links
 

1941 births
Living people
Australian male field hockey players
Olympic field hockey players of Australia
Field hockey players at the 1964 Summer Olympics
Olympic bronze medalists for Australia
Olympic medalists in field hockey
Medalists at the 1964 Summer Olympics
People from Maryborough, Queensland